Manchester is a remote town in the Pando Department of northern Bolivia, on the banks of the Manuripi River in Bolivian Amazonia.

Anthony Webster-James, a metallurgical engineer from Manchester, England, set up a rubber smelter in the area, in association with Simon Patino, towards the end of the 19th century. A workers' settlement grew up around the facility, which Webster-James named Manchester, after his hometown. As there are few metalled roads in the region, most goods and people are transported by river.

References
Notes

Bibliography

External links
From Manchester to Manchester: an adventure in Bolivia

Populated places in Pando Department